Sietsema is a surname. Notable people with the surname include:

George Sietsema (1918–1991), American politician
Hennie Sietsema, Dutch kortebaanschaatsen speed skater
Jelt Sietsema (1921–2005), American politician
Paul Sietsema (born 1968), American artist
Robert Sietsema, American food critic